Hugh Asher Stubbins Jr. (January 11, 1912 – July 5, 2006) was an architect who designed several high-profile buildings around the world.

Biography
Hugh Stubbins was born in Birmingham, Alabama, United States, and attended Georgia Institute of Technology before getting his master's degree from Harvard University's Graduate School of Design where he studied with Walter Gropius, a founder in Germany of the Bauhaus movement.  He was to remain on the faculty there until 1972.

He formed Hugh Stubbins and Associates.  Its successor company, The Stubbins Associates, merged with Philadelphia-based Kling in 2007 to form KlingStubbins. The New York Times called his 1977 Citicorp Center "by any standard...one of New York's significant buildings."

Stubbins died July 5, 2006, of pneumonia, at Mount Auburn Hospital in Cambridge, Massachusetts.

Works
Among the buildings he designed:
1946 Stubbins family home, Lexington, Massachusetts
1957 Kongresshalle, Berlin, Germany
1952-1953 Lantern Hill Subdivision in East Lansing, Michigan
 1959 Administrative buildings at Brandeis University, Waltham, Massachusetts: Irving Presidential Enclave, Gryzmish Academic Center, and Bernstein-Marcus Administration Center
1960 Loeb Drama Center, Harvard University
1960 Norman and Marion Perry House, Campton, New Hampshire
 1964 The New New Quad, later known as Butler College, Princeton University (demolished)
 1964 Coles Tower at Bowdoin College, Brunswick, Maine
1965 Francis A. Countway Library of Medicine, Harvard Medical School
1966 Southwest Residential Area at University of Massachusetts Amherst

1968 The Hotchkiss School, Main Building 
1968 Forsyth Wickes Addition, Museum of Fine Arts, Boston
 1968 Jadwin Physics Building, Princeton University
1968-1971 Johnson Library Center, Cole Science Center, Franklin Patterson Hall and Dormitories at Hampshire College
 1970 Usdan Student Center, Brandeis University
1970 George Robert White Wing, Museum of Fine Arts, Boston
1971 Veterans Stadium in Philadelphia (demolished 2004)
1972 Daniel Burke Library at Hamilton College, Clinton, New York
1973 Pusey Library, at 27 Harvard Yard, Harvard University, Cambridge, MA
1976 Federal Reserve Bank of Boston
1976 Seeley G. Mudd Manuscript Library at Princeton University
1977 Citigroup Center in New York
1971 College Five, renamed Porter College, University of California Santa Cruz
1983 One Cleveland Center in Cleveland
1984 PacWest Center in Portland, Oregon
1986 Treasury Building, Singapore
1988 Fifth Avenue Place, Pittsburgh, Pennsylvania
1988 Nashville City Center, Nashville, Tennessee
1990 Salesforce Tower, Indianapolis, Indiana
1991 Ronald Reagan Presidential Library in Simi Valley, California
1993 Yokohama Landmark Tower in Japan

References

External links
Official site 2007 archive
Hugh Stubbins and Associates Emporis archive
The Stubbins Associates, Inc. Emporis archive
Lansing City Pulse article on Lantern Hill subdivision

1912 births
2006 deaths
20th-century American architects
Artists from Birmingham, Alabama
Georgia Tech alumni
Harvard Graduate School of Design alumni
Harvard University faculty